Tseung Kwan O Pioneers is a local political group based in Tseung Kwan O founded in 2016. In a historic pro-democracy landslide in 2019 District Council election, the group won two seats in the Sai Kung District Council.

History
Tseung Kwan O Pioneers was founded in March 2016 by three young Tseung Kwan O residents, Chan Wai-lit, Cheung Fung-kiu and Cheung Wai-chiu who, inspired by the Umbrella Revolution, aimed to provide community services in Choi Kin, Fu Nam and King Lam, respectively.

The Pioneers clashed with other pro-democracy parties in those districts. While Cheung Fung-kiu did not run eventually, Chan Wai-lit and Cheung Wai-chiu failed to coordinate with other pro-democratic candidates which resulted in more than one pro-democrat running in the those constituencies. However, both Chan and Cheung were elected with majority of votes in Choi Kin and King Lam despite the clashes.

Performance in elections

Sai Kung District Council elections

References

External links
TKO Pioneers's facebook page

Political organisations based in Hong Kong
Political parties established in 2016
2016 establishments in Hong Kong
Liberal parties in Hong Kong
Localist parties in Hong Kong